Bauhinia bowkeri is a species of legume in the family Fabaceae. It is a scrambling shrub or small tree found only in South Africa, where it is threatened by habitat loss.

References

bowkeri
Endemic flora of South Africa
Vulnerable plants
Taxa named by William Henry Harvey
Taxonomy articles created by Polbot